A broach spire is a type of spire (tall pyramidal structure), which usually sits atop a tower or turret of a church. It starts on a square base and is carried up to a tapering octagonal spire by means of triangular faces.

References

Architectural elements
Church architecture